Ozyora is a village in Udomelsky District of Tver Oblast, Russia.

References

Rural localities in Udomelsky District
Vyshnevolotsky Uyezd